Jacob Karl Anders Rinne (born 20 June 1993) is a Swedish professional footballer who plays as a goalkeeper for Saudi Arabian club Al-Fateh and the Sweden national team.

Club career

Early career 
In 2010, Rinne joined Division 1 side BK Forward from sixth division side Laxå IF. In January 2013, Rinne went on a two-week trial with Premier League club Everton. On 30 May 2013, Rinne signed for Örebro SK on a three and a half year contract and was immediately loaned back to BK Forward for the rest of the 2013 season.

Örebro SK 
Rinne made his professional debut for Örebro SK in the first round of the Allsvenskan on 30 March 2014, coming on as a half-time substitute for Oscar Jansson and keeping a clean sheet while playing in Örebro's 2−1 come from behind victory over Halmstads BK. Rinne once again came off the bench on 8 May, replacing the injured Jansson and preserving the clean sheet in a 0−0 draw with Falkenbergs FF. His first start for the club came three days later, conceding two goals as Örebro fell to IFK Göteborg 2−1. Rinne played in the second round of the Svenska Cupen on 20 August 2014, keeping a clean sheet as Örebro defeated Eskilstuna City FK 2−0.

Al-Fateh
On 30 June 2022, Rinne joined Saudi Arabian club Al-Fateh on a two-year deal.

Personal life
Rinne is a supporter of Djurgårdens IF since childhood.

Career statistics

International

References

External links

Goal.com profile
Profile and latest matches at Whoscored.com (in english)

1993 births
Living people
Swedish footballers
Swedish expatriate footballers
Sweden under-21 international footballers
Sweden youth international footballers
Sweden international footballers
People from Laxå Municipality
Association football goalkeepers
Sportspeople from Örebro County
Allsvenskan players
Superettan players
Belgian Pro League players
Danish Superliga players
Saudi Professional League players
Örebro SK players
BK Forward players
K.A.A. Gent players
AaB Fodbold players
Al-Fateh SC players
Swedish expatriate sportspeople in Belgium
Swedish expatriate sportspeople in Denmark
Swedish expatriate sportspeople in Saudi Arabia
Expatriate footballers in Belgium
Expatriate men's footballers in Denmark
Expatriate footballers in Saudi Arabia